Iquê Ecological Station is an ecological station in the Juína municipality of Mato Grosso, Brazil.

Location

The  Ecological Station is in the Cerrado biome. 
It was created on 2 June 1981 and is administered by the Chico Mendes Institute for Biodiversity Conservation.
The conservation unit is in the Juína municipality of Mato Grosso.
It would be in the proposed South Amazon Ecotones Ecological Corridor.

Conservation

The Ecological Station is a "strict nature reserve" under IUCN protected area category Ia.
It was established to protect a sample of the ecosystem of the transition from the Amazon to the Cerrado.
The climate is warm and humid, with average temperatures above .
The terrain is relatively flat.
The ecology is under threat from diamond prospecting, which causes deforestation and pollution of the rivers.

References

Sources

1981 establishments in Brazil
Ecological stations of Brazil
Protected areas of Mato Grosso
Protected areas established in 1981
Cerrado